NNG may refer to:

 National Number Group, U.K. telephone numbering scheme
 Nielsen Norman Group, usability consultancy firm based in Fremont, California, U.S.
 NNG (company), Hungary-based company, developer of the iGO navigation software
 Newark North Gate railway station, in England
 Nanning Wuxu International Airport, IATA code
 N'n'G, a pseudonym of English house/garage duo Grant Nelson and Norris 'Da Boss' Windross
 Netherlands New Guinea, now known as Papua and West Papua provinces of Indonesia